Amik was the mascot of the 1976 Summer Olympics. In the Algonquin language, amik means "beaver." A national competition was held to name it. The beaver or "amik" was chosen as mascot because it is an animal strongly associated with Canada, the country where the games were held. The beaver also represents hard work.

Amik came with either a red stripe with the logo of the Montreal Olympics or a multicolored ribbon representing the Montreal Olympic Organizing Committee. Amik was designed by Guy St-Arnaud, Yvon Laroche, and Pierre-Yves Pelletier, under the direction of Georges Huel.

References

Olympic mascots
Animal mascots
Fictional beavers
1976 Summer Olympics
Mascots introduced in 1976
Canadian mascots
Fictional characters from Montreal